Dinesh Ravi, better known as Attakathi Dinesh, is an Indian actor who has acted in leading roles in Tamil cinema. He made his breakthrough playing the lead role in Attakathi (2012), portraying Dinakaran.

Career 
Dinesh completed his high school at the Dhanalakshmi Higher Secondary School in Washermenpet, Chennai. After finishing high school, he tried his luck in acting from 2010. He acted in the Vijay TV "Kadhalika Neramilai" serial after sakthi's death. After playing the son to actress Seetha in the Sun TV series Penn and minor roles in Aadukalam (2011) and Mouna Guru (2011), Dinesh made a breakthrough appearing in Attakathi (2012). The film performed well commercially and also won positive reviews, with a critic from Rediff.com noting "he's an actor of great promise". Similarly a critic from Sify.com noted Dinesh "diverts your attention from the film's little flaws and spellbinds you with an endearing act that is Attakathis biggest strength", adding that "Dinesh has come out with easily one of this year's most confident and assured performances."

After cameo appearances in Ethir Neechal (2013) and Pannaiyarum Padminiyum (2014), he was seen in a lead role again in Cuckoo (2014) produced by Fox Star Studios. His performance as a visually challenged man was praised by critics. Sify wrote "the film belongs to Dinesh, who has come out with a riveting performance" and called it "the best ever blind act since Kamal Haasan's Raja Paarvai. IANS, too, compared Dinesh to actor Kamal Haasan, stating "Dinesh is probably the next Kamal Haasan of the industry". Rediff wrote, "Dinesh has given a performance of the lifetime, his character is such a unique blend of vulnerability and defiance that every scene is worthy of praise"  and The Times of India felt that he was "superbly natural as Tamizh". He was next seen in Thirudan Police (2014) directed by debutant Caarthick Raju.

His first 2015 release was Tamizhuku En Ondrai Azhuthavum. Dinesh starred in the movie Visaranai based the novel Lock Up by M. Chadrakumar. The film premiered in the Orrizonti (Horizons) section of the 72nd Venice Film Festival, where it won the Amnesty International Italia Award. Also it received highly positive reviews from both critics and audience alike. Dinesh played a supporting character in the film Kabali alongside Rajinikanth. His future projects include Ulkuthu (2017), Annanukku Jai (2018), Kalavani Mappillai (2018) and Irandam Ulagaporin Kadaisi Gundu (2019).

Filmography

Films

Television

References

External links
 

Living people
Tamil male actors
21st-century Indian male actors
Male actors in Tamil cinema
People from Vellore
1984 births